The Bourne Objective is the eighth novel in the Bourne series and fifth by Eric Van Lustbader. The book was released on June 1, 2010, as a sequel to The Bourne Deception. This novel continues very shortly after the end of Deception, with Bourne in a race against his nemesis, Leonid Arkadin, to unlock the potential mystery of King Solomon's Gold, while fighting Russian mercenaries, assassins sent by the U.S. government, and confronting a mysterious organization that threatens to take over and run the world.

2010 American novels
Novels by Eric Van Lustbader
Bourne (novel series)
American thriller novels
American spy novels
Orion Books books
Grand Central Publishing books